Mohammed Ali Shabbir (born February 15, 1950) is an Indian politician who had served as the Opposition Leader of Telangana Legislative Council from 4 April 2015 to 22 December 2018.

He hails from an agricultural family at Kamareddy, Shabbir Ali began his career from NSUI in the late 1970s. His father (late) Mohammed Masoom was a Congress veteran and he donated his house to set up regional Congress office. Present Kamareddy DCC office is housed in the same premises.

After completing his graduation in Commerce, Shabbir Ali joined Youth Congress and actively participated in all party programmes. Shabbir Ali, along with other Youth Congress workers, were jailed for 29 days after they stormed the Legislative Assembly in 1989 to protest against the remarks by a TDP minister against Shri. Rajiv Gandhi Ji. He was given party ticket to contest from Kamareddy seat in 1989 elections. He won with an overwhelming majority and he was inducted as a minister in the cabinet of Dr. Marri Chenna Reddy. He was only 32 years when he became the minister. He was assigned the portfolios of Wakf, Sugar, Fisheries, Khadi & Village Handicrafts.

He also became India's first Minorities Welfare minister after being instrumental in creating India's first Minorities Welfare Department in 1993. For the first time in history an amount of Rs. 2 Crore was earmarked in the annual budget of 1993-94 under the head 'Welfare of Minorities'. Many other States emulated this model in future and finally, a dedicated Minority Welfare Department was created at the national level in 2006. He also initiated the process of giving reservation to Muslim community in 1994. He successfully convinced the then Chief Minister Kotla Vijayabhaskar Reddy to give reservation to Muslims in government jobs and educational institutions. A GO (MS No. 30) was issued on August 25, 1994, to give reservation to Muslims and 14 other castes. This could not go further after Congress party lost elections in 1994 and 1999.

AICC President Sonia Gandhi included the promise of 5% Muslim reservation in the election manifesto for 2004 on the request of APCC Incharge Ghulam Nabi Azad. Shabbir Ali won the 2004 election from Kamareddy seat with an overwhelming majority of over 52,000 votes. He also became a minister in Dr. Y.S. Rajashekhara Reddy's cabinet. Subsequently, 5% Muslim reservation was implemented within 58 days after coming to power. The percentage was reduced to 4% on High Court's order as per the Supreme Court's 50% ceiling on quota. This is still under implementation in both the Telugu States of Telangana and Andhra Pradesh and so far, benefitted nearly 2 Million poor Muslims. As a member of YSR Cabinet, Shabbir Ali handled the important portfolios of Information & Public Relations, Energy, Coal, Minorities Welfare, Wakf & Urdu Academy, - NRI Affairs.

He had the privilege of giving Media Briefing for 75 Cabinet Meetings during his term from 2004 to 2009. He was also District Incharge Minister for Greater Hyderabad when all big projects like International Airport, 162-km Outer Ring Road, 11 km-long Expressway and other infrastructure came up. He also served as Incharge Minister for Kadapa District for 2 years.

He also survived an assassination bid on 1 July 1997, when Naxalites planted claymore bombs to prevent him, the then MP M. Baga Reddy and others, from unveiling the statues of former Prime Ministers Smt. Indira Gandhi Ji and Shri. Rajiv Gandhi Ji in Machareddy mandal in Kamareddy constituency. As many as five Congress workers died and nine others survived with serious disabilities in that attack.

On the party front, Shabbir Ali served as State General Secretary and vice-president of AP Youth Congress. He also served as DCC President of Nizamabad for five years. He was later appointed to the posts of General Secretary and vice-president of Andhra Pradesh Congress Committee. In 2008, he was appointed Executive Member of APCC and a Member of Pradesh Election Manifesto Committee.

Shabbir Ali was elected as Member of Legislative Council, Government of Andhra Pradesh, with effect from 14-March-2013 for a period of six years i.e., to March-2019. He served as Leader of Opposition in Legislative Council from 4 April 2015 to 22 December 2018.

He was nominated a Star Campaigner in the elections for Goa (January 2017), Karnataka (2018) and Bihar (November 2020). He actively participated in the last Maharashtra Assembly elections.

On 3 June 2022, Telangana congress leaders offered "chadar" at the Dargah Hazrat Yousufain at Nampally and prayed for Sonia Gandhi's speedy recovery from Covid19. In this (i) Minorities department chairman Shaik Abdullah Sohail, (ii) OBC cell chairman Nuthi Srikanth, (iii) Hyderabad Congress minorities department former chairman Sameer Waliullah, (iv) Telangana Pradesh Congress Committee spokesperson Syed Nizamuddin, Feroz Khan, Osman Mohammed Khan, Mateen Shareef and other senior leaders offered prayers.

References

External links
The Hindu article
The Hindu article (2)

1957 births
Living people
Indian National Congress politicians from Telangana